Storm Cone is a cinder cone in northern British Columbia, Canada. It is thought to have last erupted in the Holocene period and lies on the Desolation lava field which is part of the Mount Edziza volcanic complex.

See also
List of volcanoes in Canada
List of Northern Cordilleran volcanoes
Volcanology of Canada
Volcanology of Western Canada

References

Cinder cones of British Columbia
Holocene volcanoes
Monogenetic volcanoes
Mount Edziza volcanic complex
Two-thousanders of British Columbia